Richard Fisher Belward D.D. FRS (5 September 1746 – 16 May 1803) was an academic in England  in the second half of the 18th century and the early years of the 19th. He was born Richard Fisher, adopting the name Belward in 1791.

Belward was born in Long Stratton and educated at Gonville and Caius College, Cambridge. After graduating BA in 1769 and MA in 1772 he was ordained that year. He was a Fellow at Caius from 1769 to 1790 when he became their President ofFellows. In 1795 he became its Master; and in 1796 Vice-Chancellor of the University.

References 

People from South Norfolk (district)
People educated at Eton College
18th-century English Anglican priests
Masters of Gonville and Caius College, Cambridge
Fellows of Gonville and Caius College, Cambridge
Alumni of Gonville and Caius College, Cambridge
1746 births
1803 deaths